The Real Love Boat is an Australian reality television series, which premiered on Network 10 on 5 October 2022, and is based on the original television series The Love Boat (later revived as Love Boat: The Next Wave when it moved to UPN (now The CW in 1998) that aired on ABC from 1977 to 1986. The series takes place on Princess Cruises luxury passenger cruise ship Regal Princess in the Mediterranean. Darren McMullen serves as the host and performs the vocals for the song featured in the series' opening credits.

Crew
 Darren McMullen as Your Host
 Paolo Arrigo as Your Captain
 Hannah Ferrier as Your Cruise Director
 Daniel Doody as Your Head of Entertainment

Cast

Cast progress

Episodes

References

External links
 
 
 Production website

Network 10 original programming
2022 Australian television series debuts
2020s Australian reality television series
2022 Australian television seasons
Australian television series based on American television series
Television series by Eureka
Television series set on cruise ships
English-language television shows
Television shows filmed in France
Television shows filmed in Greece
Television shows filmed in Italy
Television shows filmed in Montenegro
Television shows filmed in Spain
Television shows filmed in Turkey
Television shows filmed in the United Kingdom
Princess Cruises